NGC 7459 is a twin spiral galaxy of magnitude 15.2 located within the constellation Pisces. It was discovered by Lewis Swift in 1886 with a 16-inch refractor. The galactic nuclei are only 15 arcsec apart.

External links
 https://web.archive.org/web/20120520010558/http://www.ngcicproject.org/ngcicdb.asp

Spiral galaxies
7459
Pisces (constellation)